Hyderabad Airport Development Authority or HADA is an organisation which looks into development around the Rajiv Gandhi International Airport, Hyderabad. The Government of Andhra Pradesh constituted this agency to look into the master plan for the airport development area.

References

Organisations based in Hyderabad, India
State agencies of Telangana
Government of Hyderabad, India
Transport in Hyderabad, India
1996 establishments in Andhra Pradesh
Airports in Telangana
Government agencies established in 1996
2008 disestablishments in India
Government agencies disestablished in 2008